Business Line or The Hindu Business Line is an Indian business newspaper published by Kasturi & Sons, the publishers of the newspaper The Hindu located in Chennai, India. The newspaper covers priority industry verticals, such as Agriculture, Aviation, Automotive, IT, in weekly specials.

The paper is printed at 17 centres across India, reaching metros as well as emerging Tier I and Tier II cities. Business Line has a daily circulation of 1,17,000 copies, per the Audit Bureau of Circulation in 2016.

See also
List of newspapers in India

References

External links

1994 establishments in Tamil Nadu
English-language newspapers published in India
The Hindu Group
Newspapers published in Kolkata
Business newspapers published in India
Companies based in Chennai
Publications established in 1994
Newspapers published in Vijayawada